The 181st Street station (also known as 181st Street–Fort Washington Avenue) is a station on the IND Eighth Avenue Line of the New York City Subway. It is located beneath Fort Washington Avenue in the Hudson Heights section of the Washington Heights neighborhood, between 181st and 184th Streets. The station is served by the A train at all times.

The 181st Street station opened in 1932 and has two tracks and two side platforms. It is located near Bennett Park, the highest natural point in Manhattan. The station has two exits to Fort Washington Avenue: one at 181st Street and another across from Bennett Park. A third entrance is at 184th Street and Overlook Terrace at the bottom of the hill; elevators connect the Bennett Park and Overlook Terrace entrances. The station is listed on the National Register of Historic Places.

History 

On December 9, 1924, the New York City Board of Transportation (BOT) gave preliminary approval to the construction of a subway line along Eighth Avenue, running from Chambers Street to 207th Street. The line included a tunnel under Fort Washington Avenue in Washington Heights, Manhattan. The BOT began constructing a station at 181st Street in 1928 as part of a subway expansion. Squire J. Vickers, the chief architect of the Dual System, helped design the 181st Street station. He was responsible for most stations on the city-operated Independent Subway System (IND), and, being a painter, he did tile work for the station. Robert Ridgway was hired as the chief engineer.

The station opened on September 10, 1932, as part of the IND's initial segment, the Eighth Avenue Line between Chambers Street and 207th Street. Construction of the whole line cost $191.2 million. Service at this station was provided with express service from its onset. While the IRT Broadway–Seventh Avenue Line already provided service to Washington Heights, the new subway via Fort Washington Avenue made subway service more readily accessible. Soon after the station opened, a bus route running over the George Washington Bridge began connecting this station to Fort Lee, New Jersey, for a fare of five cents. The construction of the station spurred development in the surrounding area. Its opening resulted in the development of residential apartment buildings around the station.

In December 1950, the New York City Board of Transportation issued a report concerning the construction of bomb shelters in the subway system in the midst of the Cold War. Five deep stations in Washington Heights, including the 181st Street station, were considered to be ideal for being used as bomb-proof shelters. The program was expected to cost $104 million. These shelters were expected to provide limited protection against conventional bombs, while providing protection against shock waves and air blast, as well as from the heat and radiation from an atomic bomb. To become suitable as shelters, the stations would require water-supply facilities, first-aid rooms, and additional bathrooms. However, the program, which required federal funding, was never completed.

The 181st Street station is mostly unchanged from its original design, although it has deteriorated over time, with some water damage. On March 30, 2005, the 181st Street station was listed on the National Register of Historic Places. The station was considered historically and architecturally significant as an early IND station that retained many of its original features. 

In May 2022, the three escalators leading to the 181st Street exit were all closed for repairs until February 2023. As a result, riders had to either use the 184th Street exit or walk up nearly 90 steps. The escalators had suffered periodic outages over the years; they were all closed simultaneously because they were powered by the same motor.

Elevator modifications 
From 1932 until 1957, pedestrians had to pay a fare to use the elevators. Though the elevators were intended for subway riders, local residents paid the subway fare to avoid climbing about eight stories up Fort Washington Hill. On September 5, 1957, the New York City Transit Authority (NYCTA) began allowing free public access to the elevators at the 181st and 190th Street stations. Bills were proposed in the New York State Legislature to put the elevators out of fare control, but these failed in committee. The NYCTA agreed once Joseph Zaretzki, the local State Senator, requested the change.

During the 1970s, the NYCTA attempted to eliminate the elevator attendants at this station once the elevators become automatic, but was not able to do so as a state law was passed by the urging of local politicians that required them to stay on the job. For four months during 1999, the station was closed while repairs were made to the elevators.

In July 2003, to reduce costs, the Metropolitan Transportation Authority (MTA) announced that as part of its 2004 budget it would eliminate 22 elevator operator positions at this station and four others in Washington Heights, leaving one full-time operator per station. The agency had intended removing all the attendants at these stops, but kept one in each station after many riders protested. The change took effect on January 20, 2004 and saved $1.2 million a year. In November 2007, the MTA proposed savings cuts to help reduce the agency's deficit. As part of the plan, all elevator operators at 168th Street, along with those in four other stations in Washington Heights, would have been cut. MTA employees had joined riders in worrying about an increase in crime as a result of the cuts after an elevator operator at 181st Street on the Broadway–Seventh Avenue Line helped save a stabbed passenger. The move was intended to save $1.7 million a year. However, on December 7, 2007, the MTA announced that it would not remove the remaining elevator operators at these stations, due to pushback from elected officials and residents from the area. In October 2018, the MTA once again proposed removing the elevator operators at the five stations, but this was reversed after dissent from the Transport Workers' Union.

The elevator attendants serve as a way to reassure passengers as the elevators are the only entrance to the platforms, and passengers often wait for the elevators with an attendant. The attendants at the five stations are primarily maintenance and cleaning workers who suffered injuries that made it hard for them to continue doing their original jobs. Riders of the 181st Street station have connected with the station's elevator attendants. For instance, in 2000, one elevator attendant put up images of popular jazz musicians while playing jazz music. The MTA ordered the posters removed, but 300 residents protested their removal. The elevator attendants have been known to attempt to cheer up commuters by playing music. A 2003 New York Times article stated that one operator played calypso music and merengue music from a portable CD player, and that "on occasion a dour-faced occupant will execute a brief tap or samba step on the way out".

The station's elevators closed for replacement on August 3, 2019, and reopened almost exactly a year later on August 2, 2020. The elevators that were replaced had been in service since the early 1930s, while the new elevators contained wider doors to allow for faster passenger entry and exit. During the replacement, the station remained open via the exits to 181st Street and Overlook Terrace.

As part of the MTA's 2020–2024 Capital Program, the 181st Street station was selected to receive elevators as part of a process to expand the New York City Subway system's accessibility. By February 2021, funding had been committed to accessibility renovations at the 181st Street station. In December 2021, the MTA awarded a contract for the installation of elevators at eight stations, including the 181st Street station. , work on the ADA-accessible elevators was scheduled to begin in September 2022; the project was scheduled to be completed in June 2023.

Station layout 

This underground station has two tracks and two side platforms. The platform level contains a single barrel-vaulted ceiling.

The outer walls of the platform level consist of tiled alcoves, slightly recessed within concrete arches. The station's tiles are colored maroon to help riders identify their station more easily, part of a color-coded tile system for the entire Independent Subway System. Small maroon, black, and white mosaics with the number "181" are located within some of the alcoves. Within the alcoves that do not contain the "181" mosaic, there are black tiles with white numerals reading "181". The uptown platform has black-and-white signs for Yeshiva University.

A pedestrian concourse is located above the platforms along the station's entire length, supported from the cemented barrel-vaulted ceiling by steel "Y"-shaped struts. This concourse connects the two mezzanines at the north and south ends of the station and has four steel-and-concrete stairs to each platform. There are metal railings along the concourse, from which the platforms can be seen. The southern mezzanine has a station agent booth and storage rooms.

Entrances and exits 
The 181st Street station has three entrances. Two of them are located at the top of a hill along Fort Washington Avenue: one between West 183rd and 185th Streets, across from Bennett Park, and the other at 181st Street. The third, at Overlook Avenue and 184th Street, is located at the bottom of a hill. The entrances at the 181st Street station were designed so as to not be sidewalk obstructions like those constructed by the Interborough Rapid Transit Company and the Brooklyn–Manhattan Transit Corporation, the two other subway operators in the city. To accomplish this goal, the entrance at Overlook Terrace was placed on city-owned property near the station, and the entrance at Fort Washington Avenue between 183rd and 185th Streets was placed in a building. The entrances at Fort Washington Avenue at 181st Street could not be erected within buildings.

The entrance at Overlook Terrace leads to a  passageway to the northern mezzanine. This entrance is accessed from a single-story head house with a stepped roof and a facade of stone and ashlar. This headhouse contains two arches surrounded by interlacing diamond motifs; there are wooden doors within each arch. A backlit, Art Deco "Subway" sign is located above and in between the archways, atop a stone pedestal.

The entrance on Fort Washington Avenue between 183rd and 185th Streets leads to three elevators that descend  to mezzanine level. It is entered from a single-story stone vestibule with a pointed diamond-shaped arch surrounded by an interlacing diamond motif. The arch is surrounded by zigzag motifs, and there is a backlit Art Deco "Subway" sign above this arch. In addition, four wooden doors are recessed within the entrance vestibule. The top of the entrance vestibule contains zigzagging horizontal lines.  The vestibule leads to a slightly recessed masonry structure that rises two stories above the height of Fort Washington Avenue. The masonry structure forms the top of a seven-story mechanical structure with an emergency staircase, the three elevators, and the station's ventilation system.

The entrance at Fort Washington Avenue and 181st Street consists of four stairs, two to each southern corner of the intersection. These stairs lead to a small landing immediately below the intersection, which in turn leads to the escalators that descend to the southern mezzanine.

Elevators 
The highest natural point on Manhattan Island is in Bennett Park, adjacent to the station exit on Fort Washington Avenue between West 183rd and 185th Streets (along the axis of where West 184th Street would be located). Because of the station's depth, long escalators lead to 181st Street at the south end, and elevators at the north end of the station carry passengers to the Bennett Park exit. The elevators were formerly only open during the daytime and required the payment of a fare to use. Since 1957, the elevators have not required the payment of a fare, so pedestrians traveling between Overlook Terrace and Fort Washington Avenue are allowed to use the elevators for free. There are also free elevators for pedestrians at 190th Street, the next station uptown, as well as at 191st Street on the IRT Broadway–Seventh Avenue Line.

The elevators at the 181st Street station are not ADA-accessible , since there are no elevators leading from the fare control area to the platforms. However, unlike at 190th Street, patrons with wheelchairs are able to traverse from this entrance to the passageway out to Overlook Terrace, as the elevators provide direct access to both the mezzanine and street level. In December 2019, the MTA announced that this station would become ADA-accessible as part of the agency's 2020–2024 Capital Program. There is a staircase available in case of an emergency.

In popular culture 

The station is mentioned in the title song of the Broadway musical In the Heights by Lin-Manuel Miranda, where Usnavi says to take the A train "even farther than Harlem to Northern Manhattan and maintain, get off at 181st and take the escalator. I hope you're writing this down I'm gonna test ya later".

On September 13, 1980, aspiring pianist Eric Kaminsky was robbed and stabbed to death in the station.  His murder became the basis for his mother's book The Victim's Song.

References

External links 

 
 181st Street entrance from Google Maps Street View
 Overlook Terrace entrance from Google Maps Street View
 Fort Washington Avenue entrance from Google Maps Street View
 Platform from Google Maps Street View

1932 establishments in New York City
IND Eighth Avenue Line stations
New York City Subway stations in Manhattan
Railway and subway stations on the National Register of Historic Places in Manhattan
Railway stations in the United States opened in 1932
Washington Heights, Manhattan